Ainmean-Àite na h-Alba ("Gaelic Place-Names of Scotland") is the national advisory partnership for Gaelic place names in Scotland. Ainmean-Àite na h-Alba are based at Sabhal Mòr Ostaig on Skye.

History
Ainmean-Àite na h-Alba began as the Gaelic Names Liaison Committee, established in 2000 by the Ordnance Survey to improve consistency in Gaelic names on their mapping products. The committee expanded to become the Ainmean-Àite na h-Alba partnership in 2006.

Functions
Ainmean-Àite na h-Alba research and agree on place names, using local knowledge, historical sources and the principles of the Gaelic Orthographic Conventions. These names are used by local councils, roads authorities and the Ordnance Survey for signs and maps. AÀA are also producing a National Place-Names Database. This database was launched in August 2010, and contains over 3000 entries.

Partnerships
The partners are Argyll and Bute Council, Bòrd na Gàidhlig, Comhairle nan Eilean Siar, Highlands and Islands Enterprise, Historic Environment Scotland, Ordnance Survey, Scottish Natural Heritage, Scottish Place-Name Society, Highland Council, the Scottish Government, the Scottish Parliament and the University of the Highlands and Islands.

References

External links
Ainmean-Àite na h-Alba

Organisations based in Highland (council area)
Scottish Gaelic language
2000 establishments in Scotland
Scottish toponymy